Siah Kahur (also Romanized as Sīāh Kahūr) is a village in Rudbar Rural District, in the Central District of Rudbar-e Jonubi County, Kerman Province, Iran. At the 2006 census, its population was 155, in 30 families.

References 

Populated places in Rudbar-e Jonubi County